The Cemetery of Distinguished Citizens (Spanish, Cementerio de los Ilustres) is a cemetery located in San Salvador and together with the Cemetery of La Barmeja, it forms the Cemetery General in San Salvador. It is the burial place of prominent families of the capital of El Salvador and many outstanding figures from the history of this country.

General 
The cemetery was blessed by Bishop Tomás Occeli on August 26, 1849 as the first civil cemetery in El Salvador. This place contains the mausoleum of the president of the Federal Republic of Central America, Francisco Morazán, whose remains had been transferred from Costa Rica. However, in 1882, during the administration of President Rafael Zaldívar, a second mausoleum of the liberal caudillo was erected, since the first one had been damaged by the earthquake of 1873. The name of the area was changed to “Pantheon of Great Men” in 1913, after the burial of the president Manuel Enrique Araujo, but over time it ended up being known as “The Distinguished Citizens”.

The cemetery houses various white marble sculptures and mausoleums of artistic value that keep the remains of members of wealthy families in San Salvador. Many of the works were requested abroad, especially in Genoa, Italy, and made in Europe by artists such as Francisco Durini. Various angel figures are found in different poses; religious scenes such as The Pietà; some of the monumental size and others with peculiar characteristics denote the status of the family or the life history of the deceased. Many of them have become part of the landscape of the place and popular memory. Among them it is worth mentioning the figure of Luperca breastfeeding Romulo and Remus in the mausoleum of the Assistenza Italiana (popularly called "The She-Wolf"). And another famous one, “The Bride”, is a sculpture by Lidia S. Cristales de López, who died in 1924 six months after their marriage.

Some of the most important graves are:

 Enrico Massi
 Francisco Morazan
 Gerardo Barrios (National Monument)
 Salvador Mendieta
 Manuel Enrique Araujo
 Arturo Ambrogi
 Alfredo Espino
 Benjamin Bloom
 Schafik Handal
 Roberto d'Aubuisson
 Salvador Salazar Arrué, "Salarrué"
 Agustín Barrios Mangoré (National Monument)
 Morena Celarié
 Jacobo Árbenz (buried between 1971 and 1995, later repatriated to Guatemala)

Gallery

References

External links 
 
 Assembly Studies Declaration, Cemetery of Distinguished Citizens, National Monument
 A walk among Distinguished Citizens
Carmen Molina Tamacas (2004), The dead man is mine (The sculptures and the mausoleum that watches over his sleep as well)
 Edgardo Quintanilla, Mangoré and the Party Colorado

Cemeteries in El Salvador
Buildings_and_structures_in_San_Salvador